Queen Elizabeth Youth Centre (QEYC) is a multi-purpose indoor sporting events and entertainment centre in Tauranga, New Zealand. The centre has a maximum capacity of 2,580, having completed renovations in 2006. It hosts basketball and volleyball events regularly, and can also accommodate badminton and netball events.

In 2008, QEYC was excluded as a venue for ANZ Championship matches because it did not match the 3000-seat minimum requirement. However, the centre has been scheduled to host two ANZ Championship matches for the Waikato/Bay of Plenty Magic in the 2009 season, for home games that could not be held at the franchise's other home venues due to other bookings.

References 

Indoor arenas in New Zealand
Netball venues in New Zealand
Buildings and structures in Tauranga
Sport in Tauranga
Sports venues in the Bay of Plenty Region
Volleyball venues in New Zealand